Vuorokas iron mine was active in Vuolijoki during the years 1965-1985. During this time there were mined 1.348 million tons of ore. The ore contained on average 34% iron, 7.5% titanium and 0.2% vanadium. Together with Otanmäki mine Vuorokas mine was a major vanadium producer in the world.

References

External links 
 Publications on Metal Ore Mines in Finland / Vuorokas, Geological Survey of Finland

Iron mines in Finland
Titanium mines in Finland
Vanadium mines in Finland